Gábor Nagy may refer to:

 Gábor Tamás Nagy (born 1960), Hungarian jurist and politician
 Gábor Nagy (footballer, born 1981), Hungarian football player for Gyirmót SE
 Gábor Nagy (footballer, born 1985), Hungarian football player for Újpest FC
 Gábor Nagy (chess player) (born 1994), Hungarian chess grandmaster